Lynfield is a suburb of Auckland, New Zealand. It is under the local governance of Auckland Council. The suburb is located on the southwestern Auckland isthmus bordering the Manukau Harbour, much of which is densely forested with native forest. Lynfield was developed for suburban housing in the late 1950s and 1960s, modelled after American-style suburbs.

Etymology

The name Lynfield was first used in the area in the early 20th century, when Australian Albert William Irvine established a poultry farm on Pah Road in Epsom, later moving to land owned by Sir Alfred Bankart in the southwestern Auckland isthmus in 1913. Irvine named the farm after Lindfield, New South Wales, which was the birthplace of his wive. The college's name was adopted for the modern suburb, which developed south of the school.

Geography

Lynfield is a peninsula of the southern Auckland isthmus bounded by the Manukau Harbour. It is bordered by Lynfield Cove in the west and Wattle Bay in the east.

The Wairaki Stream (also known as Duck Creek) flows through Lynfield, entering the Manukau Harbour at Lynfield Cove.

History

The area has been settled by Tāmaki Māori iwi hapū and since at least the 13th century.  By the early 18th century, the area was within the rohe of Waiohua. After the defeat of Kiwi Tāmaki, the paramount chief of the iwi, the area became part of the rohe of Ngāti Whātua (modern-day Ngāti Whātua Ōrākei).

In 1910, Sir Alfred Bankart purchased an allotment of land between White Swan Road and the Wairaki Stream, naming his purchase the Gilletta Estate, and subdividing the area between 1919 and 1922. In 1913, farmer Albert William Irvine moved Linfield Poultry Farm from Pah Road in Epsom to the estate, after needing to upscale his business. By the next year, Irvine had moved the farm north to Boundary Road in Mount Roskill, but the name remained associated with the modern-day area.

In 1911, the Crown endowed the land to the Auckland Harbour Board, who developed the area into suburban housing in the late 1950s and 1960s. Town planner Robert Terence Kennedy was consulted to develop the suburb, who modelled the area after American-style suburbs. The area features one major road, Halsey Drive, which winds around the development. The suburb is bisected by the Avenue, which was developed as a Parisian-style boulevard. The developers chose to name the streets after luxury cruise liners that stopped in Auckland. 

The Auckland Harbour Board initially offered the houses as rental properties, available on 21-year leases. Residents protested their lack of ability to purchase their homes, and in 1968 presented a 150-member petition to the Harbour Board. In 1974, the board agreed to let residents purchase their properties, due to the harbour board experiencing a shortage of funds.

The suburb's first shop was a Four Square which opened in 1965. Suburban housing continued to be built in the area until the late 1970s.

Demographics

Lynfield had a population of 7,503 at the 2018 New Zealand census, an increase of 741 people (11.0%) since the 2013 census, and an increase of 933 people (14.2%) since the 2006 census. There were 2,247 households, comprising 3,753 males and 3,750 females, giving a sex ratio of 1.0 males per female, with 1,272 people (17.0%) aged under 15 years, 1,803 (24.0%) aged 15 to 29, 3,504 (46.7%) aged 30 to 64, and 927 (12.4%) aged 65 or older.

Ethnicities were 31.1% European/Pākehā, 4.6% Māori, 6.7% Pacific peoples, 61.3% Asian, and 3.5% other ethnicities. People may identify with more than one ethnicity.

The percentage of people born overseas was 57.6, compared with 27.1% nationally.

Although some people chose not to answer the census's question about religious affiliation, 29.4% had no religion, 31.3% were Christian, 0.1% had Māori religious beliefs, 22.0% were Hindu, 7.6% were Muslim, 2.1% were Buddhist and 3.0% had other religions.

Of those at least 15 years old, 2,328 (37.4%) people had a bachelor's or higher degree, and 651 (10.4%) people had no formal qualifications. 1,080 people (17.3%) earned over $70,000 compared to 17.2% nationally. The employment status of those at least 15 was that 3,285 (52.7%) people were employed full-time, 846 (13.6%) were part-time, and 219 (3.5%) were unemployed.

Landmarks and amenities

143 White Swan Road is a farmhouse built circa 1913, for Herbert William Brooks and Helen Brooks on the site of their pig farm, and one of the only remaining pre-1950s houses in the area. In 2017, an early learning centre opened on the site.
Lynfield Community Church, which was established in 1967. In 2016, the church was the site of a protest in support of a large number of Indian students who were threatened with deportation.
Lynfield Shopping Centre, a strip mall in Lynfield on the corner of Hillsborough Road and the Avenue.
Lynfield Tennis Club, which opened in January 1972 in Oriana Reserve.
Maungakiekie Golf Club is a large golf course that was established on Maungakiekie / One Tree Hill in 1909. The club moved from its location on the volcano in 1943, and opened at Lynfield in 1946.
The Manukau Harbour coastline between Lynfield Cove and Wattle Bay. A series of nature reserves and parks border the coastline, including Lynfield Cove Reserve, Himalaya Reserve, Manukau Domain, Halsey Esplanade Reserve, Sylvania Crescent Esplanade Reserve and Wattle Bay Reserve. The Waikōwhai Walkway is a public walkway along the Manukau Harbou coastline, linking Lynfield Cove to Onehunga in the east.
The Wairaki Stream, a two-kilometre stream bordered by native forest.​ A local volunteer group, the Friends of Wairaki Stream (FOWS), was established in 2018 and undertakes conservation work on the stream.

Education

The school was established in 1958.

Marshall Laing School was established in 1962, and is named after the son of George Laing (of Laingholm), on the site of farmland previously owned by Marshall Laing. Halsey Drive School was established in 1968.

All these schools are coeducational. Rolls are as of

Notable residents
Singer Daniel Bedingfield's family originates from Lynfield.
Motor racing driver Mitch Evans lives in Lynfield with his family when he is not pursuing his career overseas.
Housing developer and evangelist Bill Subritzky and his family lived in Lynfield from the 1960s until his death in 2015.

Local government 

The first local government in the area was the Mt Roskill Highway Board, that formed on 7 August 1868 to administer and fund the roads in the area. In 1883, the Highway Board became the Mt Roskill Road Board. The Lynfield area was a part of the Mt Roskill Borough between 1947 and 1989, after which it was amalgamated into Auckland City. On 1 November 2010, the Auckland Council was formed as a unitary authority governing the entire Auckland Region, and Wesley become a part of the Puketāpapa local board area, administered by the Puketāpapa Local Board. The Puketāpapa local board area forms a part of the Albert-Eden-Puketāpapa ward, which votes for two members of the Auckland Council. The Albert-Eden-Puketāpapa ward is represented by counsellors Christine Fletcher and Julie Fairey.

References

Bibliography

Suburbs of Auckland
Populated places around the Manukau Harbour